Diego Magallanes (born 31 March 1997) is an Argentine professional footballer who plays as a right-back for Gimnasia Jujuy, on loan from Colegiales.

Career
Magallanes made the breakthrough into first-team football with Colegiales, as he began featuring in Primera B Metropolitana after coming through their youth ranks. His professional debut arrived on 14 October 2018 against Defensores Unidos, as he made six appearances in the first half of the 2018–19 season under managers Leonardo Estévez and Juan Carlos Kopriva. In June 2022, Magallanes joined Primera Nacional club Gimnasia Jujuy on a loan deal until the end of 2023, with a purchase option.

Career statistics
.

References

External links

1997 births
Living people
Sportspeople from Buenos Aires Province
Argentine footballers
Association football defenders
Primera B Metropolitana players
Club Atlético Colegiales (Argentina) players
Gimnasia y Esgrima de Jujuy footballers